Imperium are a European professional wrestling stable consisting of wrestlers Gunther (Austria), Ludwig Kaiser (Germany) and Giovanni Vinci (Italy). They are performing in WWE on the SmackDown brand. The team previously included Alexander Wolfe (Germany).

Previously working for several European promotions, including together as part of the stable Ringkampf, Gunther and Kaiser, then known as Walter and Marcel Barthel, respectively, signed with the WWE in 2019, having been assigned to the NXT UK brand and were paired with Vinci, then known as Fabian Aichner, and Wolfe; the stable started to use the name Imperium with the motto "The mat is sacred". During the stable's time in NXT, Walter became the longest-reigning NXT United Kingdom Champion, while Barthel and Aichner became two-time NXT Tag Team Champions. In May 2021, Wolfe was kicked out of Imperium and Aichner departed from the group the following year.

In April 2022, Gunther and Kaiser debuted on the SmackDown brand as a duo, dropping the Imperium name, with Gunther winning the WWE Intercontinental Championship in June. Three months later, Vinci was reintroduced and reunited Imperium as a trio.

Background 
From 2016 to 2019, Gunther and Ludwig Kaiser (then known as Walter and Axel Dieter Jr.) were members of a stable called Ringkampf alongside Timothy Thatcher and Christian Michael Jakobi, in which they worked on several European promotions.

Ringkampf's first match occurred on 23 September 2016 when Axel Dieter Jr. teamed up with Walter and Thatcher to defeat Da Mack, Francis Kaspin and John Klinger in a tag team match at the wXw Shotgun Live Tour in Ludwigshafen. Ringkampf also wrestled for Progress Wrestling. At Chapter 47, Ringkampf (Walter, Dieter and Thatcher) challenged British Strong Style (Pete Dunne, Trent Seven and Tyler Bate) for all of their championships, in a six-man tag team match, but they were unsucessful. In October 2020, Walter announced he would close Ringkampf since he, Wolfe and Barthel wouldn't work for wXw.

History

WWE

NXT UK and NXT (2019–2022) 
On the 22 May 2019 episode of NXT UK, Walter won a rematch for the United Kingdom Championship against Dunne, after interference by the European Union (Fabian Aichner and Marcel Barthel), thus establishing himself as a heel. They would form a faction under the name Imperium. The faction would later be joined by Alexander Wolfe, after he interfered in a match pitting Imperium against British Strong Style. On the 26 June episode of NXT UK, Walter retained his title against Travis Banks. On the 3 July episode of NXT UK, Imperium interfered in Moustache Mountain's title match against Grizzled Young Veterans therefore making Grizzled Young Veterans retain their titles. After the match, they injured Tyler Bate. On 31 August at NXT UK TakeOver: Cardiff, Walter retained his title against Bate.

In the build-up for the NXT UK and NXT co-branded pay-per-view, Worlds Collide, Imperium started a feud with The Undisputed Era (NXT Champion Adam Cole, Roderick Strong, and NXT Tag Team Champions Bobby Fish and Kyle O'Reilly), and during the final moments of NXT UK TakeOver: Blackpool II on 12 January 2020, the group attacked Imperium following Walter's successful title defense against Joe Coffey, thus further intensifying it. The following week, the WWE United Kingdom Championship was renamed to NXT United Kingdom Championship and Walter was presented with a slightly updated belt design, with the WWE logo at the center being replaced with the NXT UK logo. On 13 May 2020, Barthel and Aichner defeated Matt Riddle and Timothy Thatcher (a substitute for Pete Dunne) to win the NXT Tag team Championship after Thatcher walked out on Riddle. The duo lost the titles to Breezango (Fandango & Tyler Breeze) on the 26 August episode of NXT. On the 29 October episode of NXT UK, Walter retained the United Kingdom Championship in a match against Ilja Dragunov in another highly acclaimed match.

On 19 February 2021, Walter became the longest-reigning NXT United Kingdom Champion, breaking Pete Dunne's record of 685 days, making Walter the longest-reigning champion in WWE history since 1988. On the 18 May episode of NXT, after Wolfe was defeated by Killian Dain, he was attacked by Aichner and Barthel, thus kicking him out of the faction. This was done to write him off television as Wolfe's WWE contract was due to expire the following June; he was subsequently among the group of NXT talent released from their contracts the following day. At NXT TakeOver 36, Walter dropped the United Kingdom Championship to Dragunov in a rematch ending his historic reign at 870 days. At NXT: Halloween Havoc, Aichner and Berthel regained the NXT Tag Team Championship by defeating MSK. They later lost the titles back to MSK at Stand & Deliver the following year, in a triple threat match that also involved The Creed Brothers. Their final NXT appearance was on the 5 April episode of NXT when Aichner and Barthel faced the Creed brothers in a losing effort, with Aichner walking out of their match, and Gunther facing NXT Champion Bron Breakker in a losing effort.

SmackDown (2022–present) 
On 8 April 2022, Gunther and Barthel (now going by Ludwig Kaiser) debuted on SmackDown for the first time with Gunther defeating Joe Alonzo in his first match; while their association was maintained, the Imperium name was dropped. On the 27 May episode of SmackDown, Gunther and Kaiser made their debut as a tag team against Drew Gulak and Ricochet, with Kaiser pinning Gulak for the win. On the 10 June episode of SmackDown, Gunther defeated Ricochet to win the Intercontinental Championship, making him the first Austrian to win the title. Prior to Gunther's title defense at Clash at the Castle, Kaiser announced the reformation of Imperium by reintroducing Aichner, now known as Giovanni Vinci. Gunther subsequently defeated Sheamus to retain the Intercontinental Championship, and since then Imperium has been involved in a feud with Sheamus' group The Brawling Brutes. At Extreme Rules on 8 October Imperium lost to The Brawling Brutes in a Six Man Tag Team Good Old Fashioned Donnybrook match.

Timeline

Championships and accomplishments 
 Pro Wrestling Illustrated
Ranked Gunther No. 14 of the top 500 singles wrestlers in the PWI 500 in 2019
Ranked Wolfe No. 215 of the top 500 singles wrestlers in the PWI 500 in 2019
Ranked Vinci No. 238 of the top 500 singles wrestlers in the PWI 500 in 2020
Ranked Kaiser No. 240 of the top 500 singles wrestlers in the PWI 500 in 2020
 Progress Wrestling
 PROGRESS World Championship (1 time) – Walter
 Progress Atlas Championship (1 time) – Walter
 Westside Xtreme Wrestling
 wXw Shotgun Championship (1 time) – Wolfe
WWE
NXT United Kingdom Championship (1 time) – Walter
NXT Tag Team Championship (2 times) – Barthel and Aichner
WWE Intercontinental Championship (1 time, current) – Gunther
 Wrestling Observer Newsletter
 Europe MVP (2019, 2020) – Walter

Notes

References

External links

Independent promotions teams and stables
WWE NXT teams and stables
WWE teams and stables